American musical duo She & Him have released six studio albums, an extended play (EP), 11 singles and 10 music videos. The indie pop band was formed in 2006 in Portland, Oregon, and consists of Zooey Deschanel and M. Ward.

Their debut studio album, Volume One was released by Merge Records in March 2008. In the United States, it reached number seventy-one on the Billboard 200, and has sold over 300,000 copies as of 2014. Two singles were released from the set: "Why Do You Let Me Stay Here?" and "This Is Not a Test". The duo's follow-up release, Volume Two (2010) marked their first entry in different countries worldwide, including the United Kingdom, Australia, Belgium, France, and Switzerland. On the Billboard 200, it debuted at number six with 47,000 copies, becoming their highest-peaking album and sales week to date. Its first single, "In the Sun" reached number four on US Singles Sales, making it the band's most successful single.

Released in October 2011, the band's first Christmas album A Very She & Him Christmas became their best-selling record in the United States, has sold 391,000 copies as of June 2014. Six of its songs, including the single "Baby, It's Cold Outside", charted within the US Holiday Digital Sales. In May 2013, the pair released the fourth studio album Volume 3, which sold 26,000 copies during the first week of release, and debuted at number fifteen on the Billboard 200. It was likely the highest-charting set also available on cassette tape, which comprised about 1 percent of the overall first-week sales. To promote the album, the duo released the digital-only EP The Capitol Studios Session, and two singles, "Never Wanted Your Love" and "I Could've Been Your Girl". The latter work was accompanied by a music video self-directed by Deschanel.

After signing a contract with Columbia Records, the band's major-label debut Classics was released in December 2014, which scored their fourth consecutive number-one album on US Folk Albums. She & Him's second Christmas release, Christmas Party (2016) became their first studio album not to enter the Billboard 200. According to the Recording Industry Association of America (RIAA), She & Him has sold 1.07 million albums as of June 2014. Billboard reported that holiday albums account for 40 percent of their total output.

Studio albums

Extended play

Singles

Other charted songs

Music videos

Guest appearance

See also
 List of songs recorded by She & Him
 M. Ward discography

References

External links
 She & Him discography on the official website

Discographies of American artists
Folk music discographies
Pop music group discographies
Discography